Farner may refer to:

 Farner (automobile), an American automobile manufactured by OM Farner between 1922 and 1923
 Farner, Tennessee, a community in the United States
 Farner HF Colibri 1 SL, a Swiss motor glider

People with the surname
 Caroline Farner (1842–1913), Swiss doctor and activist
 Donald S. Farner  (1915–1988), American ornithologist
 Mark Farner (born 1948), American singer, guitarist and songwriter